Lachy  (Liakhy) is a village in the administrative district of Gmina Narew, within Hajnówka County, Podlaskie Voivodeship, in northeast Poland.

References

Lachy